Patrick John "Pat" Milburn (12 May 1932 – 17 November 2013) was an Australian rules footballer who played with Collingwood in the Victorian Football League (VFL).

Notes

External links 

1932 births
2013 deaths
Australian rules footballers from Tasmania
Collingwood Football Club players